King's Oak Academy, formerly Kingsfield School and Kingswood Grammar School, is a Mathematics and Computing College located in Kingswood in  Bristol, England. The education authority Ofsted rated it as "good" in 2018.

Location and admissions
The school is located just within the unitary authority of South Gloucestershire, which borders Bristol. It is situated at the roundabout of the A420 and the A4174 (Bristol ring road), between Warmley Hill and Warmley.

History

Grammar school
The school was founded in 1921 as Kingswood Grammar School (KGS), a co-educational grammar school administered by the Gloucestershire Education Committee.

On 15 October 1946, 13-year-old Robert Hayes of Kingswood died at Cossham Memorial Hospital after being injured at the school when playing with blank cartridges he had found at an ammunition dump. His right hand was blown off and he had other injuries to his body.

In the 1960s the school had around 850 boys and girls, with 250 in the sixth form.

Comprehensive school
By 1970 it had been converted into a comprehensive school and was renamed Kingsfield School. The school was rebuilt after burning to the ground in 1976.

Academy
Kingsfield School was officially rebranded as King's Oak Academy in September 2011. Its motto is "Work hard, be kind".

Blue jumpers and red ties (formerly brown and blue) are worn, with coloured stripes according to house colour: Olympus (yellow stripes); Orpheus (blue stripes); Pegasus (red stripes); and Hercules (green stripes).

Notable alumni

Kingswood Rugby Club
Kingswood RFC Old Boys was founded in 1954/55 by a group of former students of Kingswood Grammar School. The club continues to play in the grammar school's blue and brown colours.

References

External links
 

Kingswood, South Gloucestershire
Primary schools in South Gloucestershire District
Secondary schools in South Gloucestershire District
Academies in South Gloucestershire District
Educational institutions established in 1921
1921 establishments in England
People educated at King's Oak Academy